Baochun Li from the University of Toronto, Ontario, Canada was named Fellow of the Institute of Electrical and Electronics Engineers (IEEE) in 2015 for contributions to application-layer network protocols and network coding.

References 

Fellow Members of the IEEE
Living people
Year of birth missing (living people)